The Children's Hour (released as The Loudest Whisper in the United Kingdom) is a 1961 American drama film directed by William Wyler. The screenplay by John Michael Hayes is based on the 1934 play of the same title by Lillian Hellman. The film stars Audrey Hepburn, Shirley MacLaine, James Garner and Fay Bainter (in her final film role).

Plot
In the early 1960s, former college classmates Martha Dobie and Karen Wright open a private boarding school for girls. After an engagement of two years to the doctor Joe Cardin, Karen finally agrees to set a wedding date. Joe is related to the influential Amelia Tilford, whose granddaughter Mary is a student at the school. Mary is a spoiled, conniving child who bullies her classmates.

Whilst being punished for a lie Mary had told, one of her roommates overhears an argument between Martha and her Aunt Lily. Lily accuses Martha of being jealous and having an unnatural relationship with Karen. On hearing this Mary spreads this gossip to her grandmother and Amelia spreads it around the parents of the school.

Karen learns of this and confronts Amelia about Mary accusing Martha and Karen of being lovers. Mary is foiled at convincing others that she personally saw the interactions between Martha and Karen. Using her knowledge that her roommate, Rosalie, has stolen jewelry and other personal items from a number of people, Mary forces Rosalie to corroborate her story.

The two women file a suit of libel and slander against Mrs. Tilford. A few months later, Martha and Karen are isolated at the school, having lost all of their students and ruined their reputations after losing the lawsuit. Karen calls off her engagement with Joe when he asks her if what was said about Martha and her was true. When she finds out, Martha points out that other female couples have persevered after being found out, because of the strength of their love, then admits that she has been in love with Karen for years. Karen says that Martha is just confused about her feelings, but Martha insists it is love, breaking down in tears.

Rosalie‘s mother finds the collection of stolen items her daughter has kept, leading to the revelation of Mary’s lie about Martha and Karen. Mrs. Tilford tells the judge, who will overturn the outcome of the lawsuit, publish the results in the newspaper, and a full financial settlement will be paid to the teachers. Karen tells Martha that they are still friends, and can open a new school.

Aunt Lily asks Karen about the whereabouts of Martha as her door is locked. Karen breaks loose the door's slide lock with a candleholder and discovers Martha has hanged herself in her room.

The film ends with Karen attending Martha's funeral and walking away while Joe watches her.

Cast

Production
Hellman's play was inspired by the 1810 true story of two Scottish school teachers, Miss Marianne Woods and Miss Jane Pirie, whose lives were destroyed when one of their students accused them of engaging in a sexual relationship, but in the Scottish case, they eventually won their suit, although that did not change the devastation wrought on their lives. At the time of the play's premiere (1934) the mention of homosexuality on stage was illegal in New York State, but authorities chose to overlook its subject matter when the Broadway production was acclaimed by the critics.

The first film adaptation of the play was These Three directed by Wyler and released in 1936.  Because the Hays Code, in effect at the time of the original film's production (1936), would never permit a film to focus on or even hint at lesbianism, Samuel Goldwyn was the only producer interested in purchasing the rights. He signed Hellman to adapt her play for the screen, and the playwright changed the lie about the two school teachers being lovers into a rumor that one of them had slept with the other's fiancé. Because the Production Code refused to allow Goldwyn to use the play's original title, it was changed to The Lie, and then These Three.

By the time Wyler was ready to film the remake in 1961, the Hays Code had been liberalized to allow screenwriter John Michael Hayes to restore the original nature of the lie. Aside from having Martha hang rather than shoot herself as she had in the play, he remained faithful to Hellman's work, retaining substantial portions of her dialogue.

In the 1995 documentary film The Celluloid Closet, Shirley MacLaine said she and Audrey Hepburn never talked about their characters' alleged homosexuality. She also claimed Wyler cut some scenes hinting at Martha's love for Karen because of concerns about critical reaction to the film.

The film was James Garner's first after suing Warner Bros. to win his release from the television series Maverick. Wyler broke an unofficial blacklist of the actor by casting him, and Garner steadily appeared in films and television shows over the following decades, including immediately playing leading roles in four different major movies released in 1963: The Great Escape with Steve McQueen, The Thrill of It All with Doris Day, The Wheeler Dealers with Lee Remick, and Move Over, Darling again with box office queen Doris Day.

Hayley Mills was originally offered a lead role.

Miriam Hopkins, who portrays Lily Mortar in the remake, appeared as Martha in These Three.

The film's location shooting was done at the historic Shadow Ranch, in present-day West Hills of the western San Fernando Valley.

Reception
Bosley Crowther of The New York Times observed:

Variety said, "Audrey Hepburn and Shirley MacLaine ... beautifully complement each other. Hepburn's soft sensitivity, marvelous projection and emotional understatement result in a memorable portrayal. MacLaine's enactment is almost equally rich in depth and substance." TV Guide rated the film 3½ out of four stars, adding "The performances range from adequate (Balkin's) to exquisite (MacLaine's)."
Rotten Tomatoes gives the film an 86% rating based on seven critic reviews.

Awards and nominations

The film is recognized by American Film Institute in these lists:
 2008: AFI's 10 Top 10:
 Nominated Courtroom Drama Film

See also
 History of homosexuality in American film
 List of American films of 1961
 List of LGBT-related films

References

Bibliography

External links

 
 
 
 

1961 drama films
1961 LGBT-related films
1961 films
American black-and-white films
American drama films
Remakes of American films
American films based on plays
American LGBT-related films
Films set in boarding schools
Films about educators
Films about sexual repression
Films based on works by Lillian Hellman
Films directed by William Wyler
Films scored by Alex North
Films set in schools
Films shot in Los Angeles
Films with screenplays by John Michael Hayes
Lesbian-related films
United Artists films
Homophobia in fiction
Films about anti-LGBT sentiment
1960s English-language films
1960s American films